"The Martians" is a term used to refer to a group of prominent Hungarian scientists (mostly, but not exclusively, physicists and mathematicians) of Jewish descent who emigrated from Europe to the United States in the early half of the 20th century.

Leo Szilard, who jokingly suggested that Hungary was a front for aliens from Mars, used this term. In an answer to the question of why there is no evidence of intelligent life beyond Earth despite the high probability of it existing, Szilárd responded: "They are already here among us they just call themselves Hungarians." This account is featured in György Marx's book The Voice of the Martians.

Men frequently included in the description
Paul Erdős, Paul Halmos, Theodore von Kármán, John G. Kemeny,  John von Neumann, George Pólya,  Leó Szilárd, Edward Teller, and  Eugene Wigner are included in The Martians group.

Origin of the name

The original story from György Marx's book The Voice of the Martians:

When the question was put to Edward Teller who was particularly proud of his monogram, E.T. (abbreviation of extraterrestrial) he looked worried, and said: "Von Kármán must have been talking."

According to György Marx, the extraterrestrial origin of the Hungarian scientists is proved by the fact that the names of Leó Szilárd, John von Neumann, and Theodore von Kármán cannot be found on the map of Budapest, but craters can be found on the Moon bearing their names:

Szilard (crater)
Von Neumann (crater)
Von Kármán (lunar crater)

There is also a crater on Mars named after Von Kármán.

Central European scientists who emigrated from Europe to the United States 

During and after World War II, many Central European scientists immigrated to the United States, mostly Jewish refugees fleeing from Nazism or Communism. Several were from Budapest, and were instrumental in American scientific progress (e.g., developing the atomic bomb).

References

Further reading

 The Martians
Hungarian emigrants to the United States
Jews who emigrated to escape Nazism
Cultural depictions of scientists
Science fiction people
Mars in culture